Pristimantis illotus is a species of frog in the family Strabomantidae. It is found on the Cordillera Occidental in Valle del Cauca and Cauca Departments in Colombia and southwards to the Pichincha Province, Ecuador.

Its natural habitats are cloud forests. It is threatened by habitat loss (deforestation) and pollution (spraying illegal crops).

References

illotus
Amphibians of Colombia
Amphibians of Ecuador
Amphibians described in 1997
Taxonomy articles created by Polbot